Demephion is an organothiophosphate insecticide.  It is a mixture of two closely related structural isomers demephion-O and demephion-S.

Demephion-S is listed as an extremely hazardous substance according to the U.S. Emergency Planning and Community Right-to-Know Act.

References

Acetylcholinesterase inhibitors
Organophosphate insecticides
Thioethers
Methyl esters